Vitaly Vitalyevich Fokeev (born 15 February 1974 in Rostov-on-Don) is a Russian former sport shooter who specialized in the double trap.

Fokeev was born in Rostov-on-Don, RSFSR, Soviet Union. At the 2004 Olympic Games he finished in joint 9th place in the double trap qualification. Following a shoot-off he finished tenth, missing out on a place among the top six, who progressed to the final round.

He then finished sixth at the 2005 World Championships, won the 2006 World Championships and finished second at the 2007 European Championships. At the 2008 Olympic Games he finished in sixteenth place in the double trap qualification, missing a place among the top six, who progressed to the final round.

At the 2012 Summer Olympics, he reached the men's double trap final, finishing in 5th place.

References
Profile

External links 

1974 births
Living people
Russian male sport shooters
Sportspeople from Rostov-on-Don
Shooters at the 2004 Summer Olympics
Shooters at the 2008 Summer Olympics
Shooters at the 2016 Summer Olympics
Olympic shooters of Russia
Trap and double trap shooters
Shooters at the 2012 Summer Olympics
Shooters at the 2015 European Games
European Games gold medalists for Russia
European Games medalists in shooting